The 2000 Portuguese motorcycle Grand Prix was the twelfth round of the 2000 Grand Prix motorcycle racing season. It took place on 3 September 2000 at Estoril.

This was the first Portuguese motorcycle Grand Prix since 1987. It was previously a one-off race held in Spain.

500 cc classification

250 cc classification

125 cc classification

Championship standings after the race (500cc)

Below are the standings for the top five riders and constructors after round twelve has concluded. 

Riders' Championship standings

Constructors' Championship standings

 Note: Only the top five positions are included for both sets of standings.

References

Portuguese motorcycle Grand Prix
Portuguese
Motorcycle Grand Prix